Willow Creek in Lassen County, California, is a tributary of the Susan River. The Willow Creek Wildlife Area offers wildlife viewing, bird watching and hunting along the creek.

References

Rivers of Lassen County, California